Until I Say Good-Bye: My Year of Living with Joy is a memoir by Susan Spencer-Wendel, along with her co-writer Bret Witter. A New York Times bestseller, this book tells the story of the last years of Spencer-Wendel's life, after she was diagnosed with a terminal illness. Determined to make the most of her remaining time, she made a pledge to spend an entire year devoted to joy. She took her family travelling around the world, spending as much time as possible making each other happy. She also shared the story of living with her disease by writing a memoir - the goal of which was not to write about fear or despair, but to share the happy memories that she would create in her "final wonderful year." By the time she started writing the book, she was unable to speak or walk, and used her right thumb and an iPhone to write the memoir.

An audiobook version was also produced, narrated by Karen White.

Synopsis 
In 2009, Spencer-Wendel is a successful award-winning reporter for The Palm Beach Post, a wife, and a mother of three. One night, she notices that her left hand looks withered and dying. She and her husband decide to go to the doctor's immediately to have it looked at. After about a year of doctor's visits without much answers, she is finally given a diagnosis in 2011: amyotrophic lateral sclerosis (ALS, also known as Lou Gehrig's disease).

After spending about a year in denial and searching for other possible diagnoses, she accepts her fate. Then she makes a decision to spend her time remaining - at least a year, maybe longer - dedicated to joy. She decides to go on all the trips that she'd ever wanted to take, and taker her family with her as they visit seven different places: The Yukon, The Bahamas, California, Budapest, Cyprus, New York, and Sanibel & Captiva Island. She also decides to make her backyard a relaxing area with a Chickee hut. Because she knows she will not live to see her daughter's wedding day, she takes her daughter shopping and has her try on a wedding dress. The family also adopted a new dog, Gracie, in 2010.

Main Characters 
 Susan Spencer-Wendel, a mother in her mid-forties who is diagnosed with ALS
 John Wendel, her husband, a high-school teacher 
 Marina, her fourteen-year-old daughter
 Aubrey, her eleven-year-old son
 Wesley, her nine-year-old son with autism
 Stephanie, her sister, a respiratory therapist - to whom the book is dedicated
 Don, Stephanie's husband, also a respiratory therapist
 Nancy Kinnally, her best friend since high school, who accompanied her to the Yukon Territory to see the Northern Lights
Theodora "Tee" Spencer, her adopted mother
Thomas Spencer, her adopted father
Ellen Swenson, her biological mother, a retired nurse who worked at the Mayo Clinic

Critical reception 
The book was well-received, having gotten a score of 4.04 out of 5 on GoodReads and 4.6 out of 5 on Amazon.

Success 
Within a year of the book's publication in 2013, it hit the best-seller's list of The New York Times, The Wall Street Journal, and Publishers Weekly. The book has been translated into 20 different languages.

Adaptations 
There was a movie adaptation planned, with Universal Pictures offering her a seven-figure deal. To date, no work on the movie has started.

Aftermath 
After the book's publication, the family adopted another dog, Leonard. Susan passed away from her disease on June 4, 2014.

References

External links 
 Until I Say Good-Bye Facebook Page - https://www.facebook.com/UntilISayGoodbye

Wikipedia Student Program
Autobiographies